Rob Norris (born 12 October 1987) is an English midfielder who currently plays for Loughborough Dynamo. He started his career with Football League Two club Boston United in 2004, but only made three appearances before leaving for St Albans City. He played nine times for the Saints before leaving for King's Lynn on a free transfer after finding it hard to break into the first team. However, he was with King's Lynn for just two months before he was re-signed by St Albans on 26 December 2006.

References

Robert Norris profile at the St Albans City official website

1987 births
Living people
People from Radcliffe-on-Trent
Footballers from Nottinghamshire
English footballers
Association football forwards
Boston United F.C. players
St Albans City F.C. players
King's Lynn F.C. players
Grantham Town F.C. players
Loughborough Dynamo F.C. players
Lincoln United F.C. players